Guillaume Mahot (1630 – June 4, 1684) served as the Apostolic Vicar of Cochin (1680–1684).

Biography
Guillaume Mahot was born in Argentan, France and was an ordained priest of the Société des Missions étrangères de Paris.

On January 29, 1680, Pope Innocent XI appointed him the Apostolic Vicar of Cochin and Titular Bishop of Bida. On October 25, 1682, he was consecrated bishop by Louis Laneau, Apostolic Vicar of Siam.

References

1630 births
1684 deaths
French Roman Catholic titular bishops
Paris Foreign Missions Society missionaries
17th-century Roman Catholic bishops in Vietnam
French Roman Catholic missionaries
French Roman Catholic bishops in Asia
Bishops appointed by Pope Innocent XI
Roman Catholic missionaries in Vietnam
French expatriates in Vietnam